Desmond John Herbert (born 15 March 1959) is a former Australian rules footballer who played with Collingwood and Fitzroy in the Victorian Football League (VFL).

Herbert, who had to make his way up through the thirds, was a member of the Collingwood team that lost the 1979 reserves grand final to North Melbourne. In 1980 he made five senior appearances, late in the season, but lost his place in the team before the finals. He played a further three games in 1981 before being transferred to Fitzroy mid-season, along with Leigh Carlson and Matthew McClelland, in return for Warwick Irwin. His seven games for Fitzroy that year consisted of two finals, including their dramatic one-point loss to his former club in the semi-finals. After making only seven appearances over the next two seasons, Herbert joined reigning SANFL premiers West Adelaide in 1984 and won their Best and Fairest that year.

References

1959 births
Australian rules footballers from Victoria (Australia)
Collingwood Football Club players
Fitzroy Football Club players
West Adelaide Football Club players
Living people